"Midnight in a Perfect World" is a song by American DJ and music producer DJ Shadow. It was released as the lead single from his debut studio album, Endtroducing....., on September 2, 1996. The song peaked at number 52 on the Scottish Singles Chart and number 54 on the UK Singles Chart.

Composition

Featuring a soulful vocal line and a slow drum beat, "Midnight in a Perfect World" is based around mournful piano sampled from the 1969 song "The Human Abstract" by David Axelrod. Aside from the Axelrod sample, the track also samples "Sower of Seeds" by Baraka, "Sekoilu Seestyy" by Pekka Pohjola, "Releasing Hypnotical Gases" by Organized Konfusion, "Dolmen Music" by Meredith Monk, and "California Soul" by Marlena Shaw.

Release
"Midnight in a Perfect World" was released as both a 12-inch single and CD single on September 2, 1996. In January 1997, the song was released to American college and modern rock radio stations. A music video for the song, directed by B Plus, was also released and gained much airplay on the MTV program Amp.

Track listing

UK release
 Mo' Wax — MW057 — 12" and CD release

US release
 FFRR / Mo' Wax — 162-531 084 — 12" and CD release

Charts

Release history

External links

References

1996 singles
1996 songs
DJ Shadow songs
Songs written by DJ Shadow